The Commissioners for Oaths (Ireland) Act 1872 was an Act of the Parliament of the United Kingdom of Great Britain and Ireland.

The short title for this Act was assigned by section 1 of, and the first schedule to the Short Titles Act 1896 (59 & 60 Vict. c. 14).

The Act was repealed for the United Kingdom by section 122 of, and the seventh schedule to the Judicature (Northern Ireland) Act 1978 (1978 c. 23).

The Act was retained for the Republic of Ireland by section 2 of, and the first schedule to  the Statute Law Revision Act 2007 (Number 28 of 2007).

References
The Statutes: Second Revised Edition. Volume 13. Page 219 et seq. See also p 1080. 
Irish Law Times and Solicitors' Journal. Public General Statutes, 35 & 36 Victoriae (1872.).  Page 71 et seq.

United Kingdom Acts of Parliament 1872